CSRA Inc. provided information technology services to U.S. government clients in national security, civil government, and health care and public health. Its largest market, national security, included the Department of Defense, Homeland Security, U.S. Army, U.S. Air Force, and intelligence agencies. It was the third-largest government IT and professional services company.

History 
CSRA was formed through a merger of CSC's North American Public Sector business and SRA International (formerly Systems Research and Applications Corporation) on November 30, 2015, and the company began trading on the New York Stock Exchange under the stock symbol CSRA. The company was headquartered in Falls Church, Virginia, and had offices in multiple states. CSRA sold its headquarters to Boston-based Marcus Partners, a real estate investment firm, for $33 million. On February 12, 2018, General Dynamics announced it was buying CSRA for about $9.6 billion. The acquisition was completed in April 2018.

CSRA is now part of General Dynamics Information Technology.

Markets
 Defense
 Intelligence, Homeland Security
 Civil Government
 Health

References

External links 
 CSRA Inc. – CSRA corporate website

Defense companies of the United States
Companies based in Fairfax County, Virginia
2015 establishments in Virginia
Companies formerly listed on the New York Stock Exchange
2018 mergers and acquisitions
Technology companies established in 2015
Technology companies disestablished in 2018
2018 disestablishments in Virginia
General Dynamics